The 2014 Indian general election polls in Haryana for 10 Lok Sabha seats will be held in a single phases on 10 April 2014.

The main political parties in Haryana are Indian National Congress (INC), Bharatiya Janata Party (BJP), Haryana Janhit Congress (BL) (HJC) & Indian National Lok Dal (INLD).

Alliances and parties

United Progressive Alliance

National Democratic Alliance
Haryana Janhit Congress contested from Sirsa and Hissar while Bharatiya Janata Party contested from rest of the 8 seats in state.

Indian National Lok Dal
Indian National Lok Dal contested in all 10 seats in Haryana.

Election schedule

Constituency wise Election schedule are given below-

Opinion Polls

Results
The results of the elections were declared on 16 May 2014.

Results by Constituency

References

Har
Indian general elections in Haryana
2010s in Haryana